Mitrospingus is a genus of bird formerly in the family Thraupidae. Established by Robert Ridgway in 1898, it contains the following species:

The name Mitrospingus is a combination of the Greek words mitra meaning "cap" or "head-dress" and spingos, meaning "finch".

References

 
Taxa named by Robert Ridgway
Taxonomy articles created by Polbot